La Bastiaise was a  of the French Navy (Marine nationale). The ship was built by the British shipyard Smiths Dock in their Middlesbrough shipyard, and was completed in June 1940, just before the French Armistice with Germany. She was sunk by a mine on 22 June 1940 during sea trials.

War service
At the outbreak of World War II the Marine nationale (French Navy) needed urgently ships for anti-submarine warfare (ASW) convoy escort and placed orders from Smiths Dock in South Bank, Middlesbrough for four Flower-class corvettes. Following this the Marine nationale ordered a further 18 ships, to be built both in British and French shipyards. These French Flower-class ships were identical to the British "Flowers" except that French  and 13.2 mm AA guns were to be fitted.

On 22 June 1940, the day of France's capitulation, La Bastiase was undergoing sea trials in the North Sea when she struck a mine off Hartlepool and sank. The night before Luftwaffe planes had been dropping magnetic mines into the shallow coastal waters. Forty-three French sailors died, along with at least 18 British shipyard workers. La Bastiase was not part of FFL Navy as she was serving under the Marine nationale flag but France surrendered on the day of her loss. Her commander, Lieutenant de Vaisseau Georges Albert Lacombe, died in the sinking.

Legacy
A memorial obelisk, with the names of all those who died when La Bastiaise hit a mine whilst on trials off the River Tees was dedicated at a service in Smiths Dock Park on Saturday 7 November 2015.

The crew members that died are remembered among the Forces Navales Françaises Libres members that died in the war.

See also
 List of Escorteurs of the French Navy

Notes

Sources

External links
 uboat.net
 Corvette LA BASTIAISE

Flower-class corvettes of the Free French Naval Forces
World War II corvettes of France
Companions of the Liberation
1940 ships
Ships built on the River Clyde
Ships sunk by mines